The Middle Fork Flathead River is a  river in western Montana in the United States, forming the southwestern boundary of Glacier National Park. Its drainage basin lies to the east of the South Fork Flathead River and the Hungry Horse Reservoir. Towns along the river include West Glacier, Nyack, Pinnacle, Essex, and Nimrod.

The river's headwaters lie in the Bob Marshall Wilderness at the confluence of two small streams, Strawberry Creek and Bowl Creek. From there, it runs north, receiving many tributaries from glacial valleys to the east and west, most of them inside Glacier National Park. The river begins to parallel U.S. Highway 2 as it winds north-northwest, and after a long and narrow course, the river enters a wider valley and begins to spread out and braid between meadows and forested slopes. It then enters another narrow gorge, turning generally westwards, then passing the southwestern entrance of the national park, receives a tributary from Lake McDonald, a large glacial lake to the north, from the right. The river then proceeds southwest to meet the North Fork Flathead River, southwest of West Glacier and northeast of Columbia Falls, forming the main stem of the Flathead River, which eventually flows into the Clark Fork River (the Pend Oreille River).

Tributaries 
The following minor creeks are tributaries to the Middle Fork Flathead River:

See also
List of rivers of Montana

References

Rivers of Montana
Landforms of Glacier National Park (U.S.)
Tributaries of the Columbia River
Rivers of Flathead County, Montana
Wild and Scenic Rivers of the United States